Eric Turer is an American politician. He serves as a Democratic member for the Rockingham 6th district of the New Hampshire House of Representatives.

Life and career 
Turer is a former board member of the New England Rural Health Association.

In November 2022, Turer defeated Melissa Litchfield in the general election for the Rockingham 6th district of the New Hampshire House of Representatives, winning 50 percent of the votes. He assumed office in December 2022.

References 

Living people
Year of birth missing (living people)
Place of birth missing (living people)
Democratic Party members of the New Hampshire House of Representatives
21st-century American politicians